Ladhar Kalan  is a village in Nurmahal. Nurmahal is a sub-tehsil in Jalandhar. Jalandhar is a district in the Indian state of Punjab.

About 
Ladhar Kalan lies on the Phillaur-Talwan road.

Post code 
Ladhar Kalan's post office is Khokhewal whose post code is 144036.

References 

 A Punjabi site with Ladhar Kalan's details

Villages in Jalandhar district